China, as the Republic of China, competed at the 1936 Summer Olympics in Berlin, Germany. 54 competitors, 52 men and 2 women, took part in 27 events in 7 sports. The team is the inspiration for the 2008 film, Champions.

Athletics

Track&Road events

Field events

Relay events

Combined events – Decathlon

Basketball

Rosters
Coach:Dong Shouyi

First round
  19-35

First Round Repechage
  45-38

Second round
  21-29

Second Round Repechage
  14-32

Boxing

Cycling

One male cyclist represented China in 1936.

Football

First round

Swimming

Men

Women

Weightlifting

Notes

References

External links
Official Olympic Reports
Roster of Republic of China Delegation to the 1936 Summer Olympics
 

Nations at the 1936 Summer Olympics
1936 in Chinese sport
Republic of China (1912–1949) at the Summer Olympics